San Miguel Chicahua is a town and municipality in Oaxaca in south-western Mexico. The municipality covers an area of 94.41 km².  
It is part of the Nochixtlán District in the southeast of the Mixteca Region.

As of 2005, the municipality had a total population of 2035.

References

Municipalities of Oaxaca